The 1971 Miller High Life 500 was a NASCAR Winston Cup Series event that took place at Ontario Motor Speedway in Ontario, California.

Race report
Two hundred laps were raced on the paved oval track spanning . The total time of the race was three hours, forty-three minutes, and thirty-six seconds. Held on February 28, 1971, this would be the first stock car event to take place at Ontario Motor Speedway. The only Cup race with a driver from Utah entered. Art Pollard was a DNQ and the sole Utahan to enter a national level NASCAR race until Michael Self's Xfinity starts 44 years later.

There were five cautions for 21 laps and the margin of victory was 8½ seconds. With an attendance of nearly seventy-nine thousand people. Notable crew chiefs at this event included Paul Goldsmith, Richard Elder, Harry Hyde, Dale Inman, Lee Gordon and Paul Burchard.

In the 51-car racing grid, there were 50 Americans and one Mexican, Pedro Rodríguez who finished in 47th due to an electrical fault. It was the 1000th race in NASCAR history. It would be Rodríguez' final NASCAR Winston Cup Series start. Dean Dalton would finish in last place due to being black flagged and disqualified on lap 2. The only car in the same league with Foyt was Fred Lorenzen until Lorenzen's engine blew and he crashed on the front straight with a fire. At the end, Petty had a chance to win, but he missed his pit under the green flag and had to come back in and finished third. Foyt won the first two Ontario races.

The total winnings of the race were $180,200 ($ when adjusted for inflation) - making it the biggest non-Daytona purse during that era. Manufacturers involved in the event included Chevrolet, Ford, Dodge, Mercury, and Plymouth. Other notable drivers included Elmo Langley, Fred Lorenzen, and Ron Hornaday, Sr. (whose son is a four-time Craftsman Truck Series champion). Marty Kinerk, Jim McElreath, Pedro Rodríguez and Johnny Steele all made what would be their final starts in NASCAR's top series.

Qualifying

Failed to qualify:  Jack Roberts (#20), John W. Anderson (#57), Ben Arnold (#76), Sam Rose (#09), Walter Ballard (#30), Jerry Barnett (#55), D.K. Ulrich (#40), Earle Wagner (#01), Art Pollard (#94), Harold Pagon (#36), Larry Baumel (#68), Leonard Blanchard (#95), Frank Burnett (#43W), Scotty Cain (#1), Neil Castles (#06), Markey James (#31), Vic Irvan (#5), Paul Tyler (#95), Tru Cheek (#62), Marion Collins (#78), Chris Connery (#11W), Jim Danielson (#64W), Jack DeWitt (#17W), Paul Dorrity (#15), Vallie Engelauf (#65), Doc Faustina (#5), Glenn Francis (#33), Les Loeser (#40W), Ed Negre (#8), Bill Champion (#10)

Finishing order
Section reference:

 A. J. Foyt
 Buddy Baker
 Richard Petty
 Bobby Isaac
 Dick Brooks
 LeeRoy Yarbrough
 Ray Elder
 Tiny Lund
 Benny Parsons
 James Hylton
 Elmo Langley
 Marv Acton
 Jack McCoy
 Bill Seifert
 Carl Joiner
 Friday Hassler
 Jimmy Insolo
 Jabe Thomas
 Cecil Gordon
 Bobby Wawak
 Frank James
 Ron Hornaday
 Earl Brooks
 Dick Guldstrand
 Harry Schilling
 Ivan Baldwin
 Dick Bown
 Hershel McGriff
 Henley Gray
 Fred Lorenzen
 Pete Hamilton
 Pat Fay
 Ray Johnstone
 Marty Kinerk
 J. D. McDuffie
 Jim McElreath
 Johnny Steele
 John Soares Jr.
 Bobby Allison
 Red Farmer
 Bob England
 Kevin Terris
 Bill Champion
 Don Noel
 G.T. Tallas
 Bill Osborne
 Pedro Rodríguez
 Dick Kranzler
 Ron Gautsche
 Frank Warren
 Dean Dalton

References

Miller High Life 500
Miller High Life 500
NASCAR races at Ontario Motor Speedway